Thomas Pulloppillil is the serving bishop of the Roman Catholic Diocese of Bongaigaon and a writer.

Early life 
He was born in Nadukani, Kothamangalam, Kerala, India, on 14 July 1954.

Religious life 
He was ordained a priest on 6 April 1981. He was appointed Bishop of Bongaigaon on 10 May 2000 and ordained on 20 August 2000 by Thomas Menamparampil. He has served as administrator of Oriens Theological College, Shillong. He is the chairman of Seminary Formation Commission of the North East Bishops' Council.

Books by Thomas Pulloppillil

References 

1954 births
Living people
21st-century Roman Catholic bishops in India
Christian clergy from Kottayam